An  is a person who commits, or who acts to entice another person to commit, an illegal or rash act or falsely implicates them in partaking in an illegal act, so as to ruin the reputation of, or entice legal action against, the target, or a group they belong to or are perceived to belong to. They may target any group, such as a peaceful protest or demonstration, a union, a political party or a company.

In jurisdictions in which conspiracy is a serious crime in itself, it can be sufficient for the agent provocateur to entrap the target into discussing and planning an illegal act. It is not necessary for the illegal act to be carried out or even prepared.

Prevention of infiltration by agents provocateurs is part of the duty of demonstration marshals, also called stewards, deployed by organizers of large or controversial assemblies.

History and etymology

While the practice was worldwide in antiquity, modern undercover operations were scaled up in France by Eugène François Vidocq in the early 19th century, and included the use of unlawful tactics against opponents. Later in the same century, police targets included union activists who came to fear plain-clothed policemen (agent de police in French). The French term  was then borrowed as-is into English and German.

Common usage

An agent provocateur may be a police officer or a secret agent of police who encourages suspects to carry out a crime under conditions where evidence can be obtained; or who suggests the commission of a crime to another, in hopes they will go along with the suggestion and be convicted of the crime.

A political organization or government may use agents provocateurs against political opponents. The provocateurs try to incite the opponent to do counter-productive or ineffective acts to foster public disdain or provide a pretext for the final assault against the opponent.

Historically, labor spies, hired to infiltrate, monitor, disrupt, or subvert union activities, have used agent provocateur tactics.

Agent provocateur activities raise ethical and legal issues. In common law jurisdictions, the legal concept of entrapment may apply if the main impetus for the crime was the provocateur.

By region

Russia
The activities of agents provocateurs against revolutionaries in Imperial Russia were notorious. Jacob Zhitomirsky, Yevno Azef, Roman Malinovsky, and Dmitry Bogrov, all members of Okhrana, were notable provocateurs.

In the "Trust Operation" (1921–1926), the Soviet State Political Directorate (OGPU) set up a fake anti-Bolshevik underground organization, "Monarchist Union of Central Russia". The main success of this operation was luring Boris Savinkov and Sidney Reilly into the Soviet Union, where they were arrested and executed.

United States
In the United States, the COINTELPRO program of the Federal Bureau of Investigation included FBI agents posing as political activists to disrupt the activities of political groups in the U.S., such as the Student Nonviolent Coordinating Committee, the American Indian Movement, and the Ku Klux Klan.

New York City police officers were accused of acting as agents provocateurs during protests against the 2004 Republican National Convention in New York City.

Denver police officers were also alleged to have used undercover detectives to instigate violence against police during the 2008 Democratic National Convention.

Also in New York City, an undercover motorcycle police officer was convicted of and sentenced to two years in prison in 2015 for second-degree assault, coercion, riot and criminal mischief after an incident at a motorcycle rally. In 2013, the officer, Wojciech Braszczok, was investigating motorcyclists by blending in with a crowd during the rally; at some point another motorcyclist was hit by a motorist, Alexian Lien. Braszczok is later seen on video breaking a window to Lien's car and assaulting him with others in the crowd. His actions were investigated by the NYPD and he ended up facing charges along with other members of the rally. Braszczok was eventually convicted on some of the charges laid, and received two years in prison.

Europe 
In February 1817, after the Prince Regent was attacked, the British government employed agents provocateurs to obtain evidence against the agitators.

Sir John Retcliffe was an agent provocateur for the Prussian secret police.

Francesco Cossiga, former head of secret services and Head of state of Italy, advised the 2008 minister in charge of the police, on how to deal with the protests from teachers and students:  He should do what I did when I was Minister of the Interior. [...] infiltrate the movement with agents provocateurs (sic) inclined to do anything [...] And after that, with the momentum gained from acquired popular consent, [...] beat them for blood and beat for blood also those teachers that incite them. Especially the teachers. Not the elderly, of course, but the girl teachers, yes.

Another example occurred in France in 2010 where police disguised as members of the CGT (a leftist trade union) interacted with people during a demonstration.

Canada
On August 20, 2007, during meetings of the Security and Prosperity Partnership of North America in Montebello, three police officers were revealed among the protesters by Dave Coles, president of the Communications, Energy and Paperworkers Union of Canada, and alleged to be provocateurs. The police posing as protestors wore masks and all black clothes; one was notably armed with a large rock. They were asked to leave by protest organizers.

After the three officers had been revealed, their fellow officers in riot gear handcuffed and removed them. The evidence that revealed these three men as "police provocateurs" was initially circumstantial-they were imposing in stature, similarly dressed, and wearing police boots. According to veteran activist Harsha Walia, it was other participants in the black bloc who identified and exposed the undercover police.

After the protest, the police force initially denied, then later admitted that three of their officers disguised themselves as demonstrators; they then denied that the officers were provoking the crowd and instigating violence. The police released a news release in French where they stated "At no time did the police of the Sûreté du Québec act as instigators or commit criminal acts" and "At all times, they responded within their mandate to keep order and security."

During the 2010 G20 Toronto summit, the Royal Canadian Mounted Police (RCMP) arrested five people, two of whom were members of the Toronto Police Service. City and provincial police, including the TPS, went on to arrest 900 people in the largest mass arrest in Canadian history. The RCMP watchdog commission saw no indication that RCMP undercover agents or event monitors acted inappropriately.

Internet
The internet has been a perfect tool for information warfare, with many internet trolls acting as agents provocateurs by disseminating certain propaganda. Such tactics are used to further the interests of countries, corporations, and political movements.

See also 
 Astroturfing
 Bad-jacketing
 COINTELPRO
 Covert interrogation
 Denial and deception
 Entrapment
 False flag
 Fifth column 
 Informant
 Internet troll
 Outside agitators
 Ratfucking
 Security
 Sting operation
 Umbrella man (Minneapolis riots)
Agents provocateurs
 Grant Bristow
 Brandon Darby
 Mark Kennedy (police officer)
 Bob Lambert (undercover police officer)
 Terry Norman

References 

 Belyaeva et al. (2007) published by OSCE's, Office for Democratic Institutions and Human Rights. Alternative version

External links 
 

Criminology
Espionage techniques
Law enforcement titles
Spies by role
Police misconduct